The Škoda Enyaq iV is a battery electric compact crossover SUV manufactured by Škoda Auto. It was introduced in September 2020 in Prague, while mass production commenced in November 2020. It is the first Škoda vehicle to utilize the Volkswagen Group MEB platform, with the Volkswagen ID.4 being a sister model.

The name is derived from the Irish name Enya, which originates from the Gaelic word ‘eithne’, meaning ‘essence, spirit or principle’. The Enyaq is the first model of a new naming convention within the Škoda's range where electric models' names will start with ‘E’.

Overview
The production model is called Enyaq iV and was revealed on 1 September 2020. It is assembled at the Škoda plant in Mladá Boleslav, Czech Republic for the European market. The serial production of the car for the European market in the Czech Republic commenced on 25 November 2020. The first cars have been delivered to customers in the Scandinavian region in late April 2021, and in Western and Central Europe in May 2021.

The Enyaq iV will be available either as rear-wheel drive or all-wheel drive, with three different battery capacities and five performance versions. The base model will have a 55 kWh battery pack and a  electric motor mounted on the rear axle.

The boot holds 585 litres, but there is no frunk (storage under the bonnet) unlike in some electric vehicles.

The Enyaq iV also has a Sportline variant, with a different interior and exterior styling and extended standard features.

On 17 March 2023, Škoda announced that an Enyaq Laurin & Klement would be launched.

Enyaq Coupé

The Enyaq Coupé was officially presented on January 31, 2022 in Prague. Production started at the Mladá Boleslav plant in February 2022, with an initial production target of 120 units per day. The coupé doesn't offer an entry-level version with the smaller 55kWh battery available on the regular Enyaq, but a sporty RS version completes the range.

The coupe version is  shorter in length and  taller.

Enyaq iV RS & Enyaq Coupe iV RS
Škoda recently confirmed the specifications and price for the Enyaq Coupé iV vRS model variant. The starting price for the Enyaq Coupé iV vRS in the UK, will be £51,885.

In October 2022, Škoda launched the Enyaq RS iV alongside the already available Enyaq Coupe RS iV.

Specifications

Concepts 
Prior to the presentation of the Enyaq under its current name, two concept cars had been presented: Its first development version, the Vision E, was introduced in 2017, and its second version, called the Vision iV, was introduced in March 2019.

Vision E 
The Vision E was unveiled at the 2017 Auto Shanghai and is scheduled to be produced from the second half of 2020.

Vision iV
The exterior of the Vision iV concept is 92-95 percent identical to the upcoming production version.
The Vision iV is a next development stage of the car and the last step prior to series production, revealed in March 2019.

Safety assist
The safety assist feature is taken into account in the 2021 EuroNCAP rating:

References

External links

 Official website

Škoda automobiles
Cars introduced in 2020
Crossover sport utility vehicles
Production electric cars
Rear-wheel-drive vehicles
All-wheel-drive vehicles